Gilden is a surname. Notable people with the surname include:

Bruce Gilden (born 1946), American photographer
Katya Alpert Gilden (1914–1991), American writer
Michael Gilden (1962–2006), American actor